The Vanishing American is a 1955 American Western film directed by Joseph Kane and written by Alan Le May. It is based on the 1925 novel The Vanishing American by Zane Grey. The film stars Scott Brady, Audrey Totter, Forrest Tucker, Gene Lockhart, Jim Davis and John Dierkes. The film was released on November 17, 1955, by Republic Pictures.

Plot
Marion Warner inherits a ranch from an uncle. Stranded in the desert, she encounters Blandy, a white man raised by Navajos who believes her land actually belongs to the Indians. A trading post owner, Morgan, aided by partner Blucher and hired guns Glendon and Lord, has been stealing from the Navajos and kidnapping women, including Yashi, who is held prisoner until Marion arranges her escape. An expert with a gun, Marion also rescues Etenia, the Navajo chief, after Morgan's men attempt to kill him.
  	
Blandy is able to help Marion steal documents from Morgan's safe relating to the rightful ownership of the land. Blandy is taken captive and tortured as Marion realizes she has fallen in love with him. She sends for the law, Sheriff Joe Walker, then rescues him after he is taken prisoner. Walker then takes Morgan into custody as Blandy and Marion come to the aid of the Navajos and plan a future together.

Cast
Scott Brady as Blandy
Audrey Totter as Marion Warner
Forrest Tucker as Morgan
Gene Lockhart as Blucher
Jim Davis as Glendon
John Dierkes as Freil
Gloria Castillo as Yashi
Julian Rivero as Etenia
Lee Van Cleef as Jay Lord
George Keymas as Coshanta
Charles Stevens as Quah-Tan
Jay Silverheels as Beeteia
James Millican as Walker
Glenn Strange as Beleanth

References

External links
 

1955 films
American Western (genre) films
1955 Western (genre) films
Republic Pictures films
Films directed by Joseph Kane
Films based on works by Zane Grey
Films set in the 19th century
American historical films
1950s historical films
1950s English-language films
1950s American films
American black-and-white films